Ätran may refer to:

Ätran (river), river in south-western Sweden
Ätran (locality), locality in Falkenberg Municipality, Sweden, named after the river